Elwyn Cornelius Lee (born 1949) is the Vice President for Community Relations and Institutional Access at the University of Houston. He is the husband of congresswoman Sheila Jackson Lee, a member of the United States House of Representatives.

Lee was a law professor at the University of Houston Law Center, where he taught the law of employment discrimination.

See also 

 History of African-Americans in Houston

References 

Living people
University of Houston faculty
Yale Law School alumni
1949 births